The Sam M. Walton College of Business (often known as Walton College or abbreviated WCOB on campus) is the business college at the University of Arkansas in Fayetteville, Arkansas. Created in 1926, the college is the second-largest college at the University, with over 5,000 undergraduate students as of Fall 2016. Walton College is known nationally for a strong emphasis on retail, finance, information systems, and supply chain management. The college has a close relationship with Walmart Stores, Inc., based in nearby Bentonville, Arkansas, and related vendor community.

The Sam Walton College of Business is among the top 25 undergraduate business schools and ranked in the top fifty graduate business schools in the nation in results published by U.S. News & World Report. The Master of Business Administration program is often ranked in the top 50 graduate business schools in the US. The Wall Street Journal ranked the University of Arkansas’s Walton M.B.A. the 11th best return on investment out of 600 other business programs in the United States. The analysis, which reviewed federal student loan and post-graduation salary data, found that students in the program take on an average of $27,800 in federal student loan debt and go on to earn an average of $106,421 annually two years after graduating.

History

The School of Business Administration was established within the University of Arkansas in 1926.

Eponym

The college is named after the founder of Walmart Stores, Inc., Sam Walton, when in October 1998, the Walton Family Charitable Support Foundation made a $50 million upfront cash gift. The company is headquartered in nearby Bentonville, Arkansas, and employs hundreds of Walton College graduates. This was the largest ever given to a public business college at the time. This established the "Sam M. Walton College of Business Administration", but the name was shorted to the "Sam M. Walton College of Business" in 2000.

Leadership
The College of Business has had 10 deans since 1926, and two interim deans.
Charles C. Fichtner (1926–1940)
Karl M. Scott (1941–1943)
Paul W. Milam (1944–1966)
Acting Dean Merwyn G. Bridenstine (1966–1967)
John P. Owen (1967–1983)
Lloyd Seaton (1983–1989)
 Stan Smith (1989–1992)

Interim Dean Thomas McKinnon (1992–1993)
Doyle Z. Williams (1993–2005)
Dan L. Worrell (2005–2012)
Eli Jones (2012–2015)
Matthew A. Waller (2015 to present).

Departments

Department of Accounting
Department of Economics
Department of Finance
Department of Information Systems
Department of Management
Department of Marketing
Department of Supply Chain Management

Honors

Walton College is ranked as the 26th top public business school in the nation, and is ranked 43rd among all public and private schools. The Information Systems department is ranked 1st in the world for research productivity in top journals and has been consistently recognized among the top 5 Information Systems departments. It has also been recognized for its 13th ranked Marketing program among all US business schools (6th among public schools), 19th ranked Corporate Strategy program (6th among public schools),11th ranked Accounting program in its division, 19th ranked public Supply Chain Management program, and 39th ranked public Masters in Business Administration program.

Leadership Initiatives 
In 2020, Walton College created two leadership initiatives geared toward ethics and the customer experience.

 Business Integrity Leadership Initiative - founded by Cindy Moehring
 Customer Centric Leadership Initiative - founded by Andrew L. Murray

Facilities
Business education at the University of Arkansas began on the third floor Old Main in 1926. Known as the School of Business Administration, four faculty and 21 students began business education at UA. In 1928, the school moved to the former engineering building, which was renamed the Commerce Building.

The College moved to its present location at 220 North McIlroy in 1978 following the completion of the Business Building. It was renamed to Sam M. Walton College of Business Administration following a $50 million donation from the Walton Family Charitable Support Foundation in 1998. The Donald W. Reynolds Center for Enterprise Development at 145 North Buchanan was built following a grant from Donald W. Reynolds Foundation in 1996.

Following the Campaign for the 21st Century, the Walton College saw a period of rapid facility growth. Willard J. Walker Hall at 191 North Harmon and the J.B. Hunt Transport Services Center for Academic Excellence at 227 North Harmon opened in 2007 adjacent to the Business Building, enclosing the Linda Sue Shollmier Plaza and creating a business campus within the southern part of the UA campus. The McMillon Innovation Studio, named for alumnus Doug McMillon, was opened in a former retail space at 146 North Harmon near the other business buildings in 2016.

A gallery, with dates used by the College of Business in parentheses, shows the facilities used throughout the years.

Notable alumni
 Justin Boyd, pharmacist and politician representing the Fort Smith area in the Arkansas House of Representatives from 
Timothy L. Brooks, lawyer and judge of the United States District Court for the Western District of Arkansas from 2014 to present
 William T. Dillard II
 Scott Flippo, business owner and politician representing the Bull Shoals Lake area in the Arkansas State Senate
 James Hannah, Chief Justice of the Arkansas Supreme Court from 2005 to 2015
 Bart Hester, politician representing part of Benton County in the Arkansas State Senate
George Lavender, businessman and politician in the Texas House of Representatives from 2011 to 2015
George McGill, mayor of Fort Smith, Arkansas
Greg Leding, businessman and politician representing Fayetteville in the Arkansas House of Representatives from 2011-2017
 Doug McMillon, Chief Executive Officer, Wal-Mart
 Marcus Monk, professional football and basketball player
 Charles Robinson, former Treasurer of Arkansas from 2013 to 2015
 Marshall Wright, lawyer and politician representing St. Francis County in the Arkansas House of Representatives
 Johnny Carver, sports author

See also
 Varun Grover, Walton professor and chair of the Department of Information Systems, noted for his information systems research

References

External links
 

University of Arkansas
Buildings and structures in Washington County, Arkansas
Educational institutions established in 1926
1926 establishments in Arkansas